Mary Gonzaga Leahy (12 June 1870–17 January 1958) was a New Zealand catholic nun and hospital matron. She was born in Waimea West, Nelson, New Zealand on 12 June 1870.

References

1870 births
1958 deaths
20th-century New Zealand Roman Catholic nuns
People from Nelson, New Zealand
19th-century New Zealand Roman Catholic nuns